Municipal election for Nepalgunj took place on 13 May 2022, with all 117 positions up for election across 23 wards. The electorate elected a mayor, a deputy mayor, 23 ward chairs and 92 ward members. An indirect election will also be held to elect five female members and an additional three female members from the Dalit and minority community to the municipal executive.

Prashant Bista from Nepali Congress was elected as the mayor of the sub metropolitan city.

Background 

Nepalgunj was established as a municipality in 1969. The sub-metropolitan city was created in 2014 by merging neighboring village development committees into Nepalgunj municipality. Electors in each ward elect a ward chair and four ward members, out of which two must be female and one of the two must belong to the Dalit community. 

In the previous election previous mayor of the municipality Dhawal Shamsher Rana from Rastriya Prajatantra Party was elected as the first mayor of the sub-metropolitan city. He did not contest for re-election and instead announced his intention to run for the House of Representatives.

Candidates

Results

Mayoral election

Ward results 

|-
! colspan="2" style="text-align:centre;" | Party
! Chairman
! Members

|-
| style="background-color:;" |
| style="text-align:left;" |Nepali Congress
| style="text-align:center;" | 5
| style="text-align:center;" | 36
|-
| style="background-color:;" |
| style="text-align:left;" |CPN (Unified Marxist-Leninist)
| style="text-align:center;" | 5
| style="text-align:center;" | 20
|-
| style="background-color:;" |
| style="text-align:left;" |People's Socialist Party, Nepal
| style="text-align:center;" | 6
| style="text-align:center;" | 18
|-
| style="background-color:;" |
| style="text-align:left;" |Rastriya Prajatantra Party
| style="text-align:center;" | 3
| style="text-align:center;" | 11
|-
| style="background-color:;" |
| style="text-align:left;" |CPN (Maoist Centre)
| style="text-align:center;" | 4
| style="text-align:center;" | 7
|-
! colspan="2" style="text-align:right;" | Total
! 23
! 92
|}

Results by ward

Council formation

See also 

 2022 Nepalese local elections
 2022 Lalitpur municipal election
 2022 Kathmandu municipal election
 2022 Janakpur municipal election
 2022 Pokhara municipal election

References

Nepalgunj